Petroscirtes pylei, the twilight fangblenny, is a species of combtooth blenny found in the western central Pacific ocean, around Fiji.  This species reaches a length of  SL. The specific name honours the American ichthyologist Richard L. Pyle of the Bishop Museum in  Honolulu.

References

pylei
Fish described in 2005